Pir Shahid (also Romanized as Pīr Shahīd) is a village in Golian Rural District, in the Central District of Shirvan County, North Khorasan Province, Iran. At the 2006 census, its population was 697, in 174 families.

References 

Populated places in Shirvan County